Damon Silvers is an American lawyer and former government employee who serves as a policy director for the AFL-CIO. Silvers led the AFL-CIO legal team that won severance payments for laid off Enron and WorldCom workers. Silvers also served as Deputy Chair of the Congressional Oversight Panel from 2008 to 2010.

Early life and education 
Silvers was raised in Hartford, Connecticut, Philadelphia and Richmond, Virginia. Silvers attended Bellevue Elementary School and Open High School in Richmond, Virginia. Silvers graduated summa cum laude from Harvard College in 1986. Silvers received his J.D. with honors from Harvard Law School. He received his M.B.A. with high honors from Harvard Business School as a Baker Scholar. Silvers also studied history at King's College, Cambridge.

At Harvard, Silvers was a leader of the anti-apartheid Divestment movement, which role did not prevent him from applying for a Rhodes Scholarship, which was funded by British colonialism in southern Africa.  He was one of two undergraduates invited by Local 26 of the union which represented Harvard's dining hall staff to join their negotiating team in 1986.

Career 
Silvers is a member of the Public Company Accounting Oversight Board Standing Advisory Group, the Financial Accounting Standards Board User Advisory Council, and the American Academy of Arts and Sciences Corporate Governance Task Force. On November 14, 2008, Silvers was appointed by Speaker of the House Nancy Pelosi and the majority leader of the Senate Harry Reid to serve on the five-member Congressional Oversight Panel created to oversee the implementation of the Emergency Economic Stabilization Act. Silvers previously clerked at the Delaware Court of Chancery for Chancellor William T. Allen.

In November 2020, Silvers was named a volunteer member of the Joe Biden presidential transition Agency Review Team to support transition efforts related to the United States Department of Treasury and the Federal Reserve.

References

External links
bio

Alumni of King's College, Cambridge
American labor lawyers
Harvard Business School alumni
Harvard Law School alumni
Lawyers from Richmond, Virginia
Living people
Year of birth missing (living people)
Harvard College alumni